Gremlins: Secrets of the Mogwai is an upcoming American computer-animated fantasy comedy television series which is scheduled for release on HBO Max in the United States. The series consists of 10 episodes and is intended to be a prequel to the 1984 film Gremlins and its 1990 sequel The New Batch. Set in 1920s Shanghai, East China, Secrets of the Mogwai tells the story of how 10-year-old Sam Wing met Gizmo, a young Mogwai. It was written and executive produced by Tze Chun. Darryl Frank, Justin Falvey, Sam Register, and Brendan Hay also serve as executive producers. In February 2021, ahead of the series premiere, the series was renewed for a second season.

The first episode had its world premiere at the Annecy International Animation Film Festival on June 13, 2022. The series was going to air on HBO Max in 2022, consisting of 10 episodes, but was delayed to 2023. The series is also set to air on Cartoon Network as part of their ACME Night block.

Premise 
The series will focus on how 10-year-old Sam Wing met the young Mogwai called Gizmo. Along with a teenage street thief named Elle, Sam and Gizmo take a perilous journey through the Chinese countryside, encountering, and sometimes battling, colorful monsters and spirits from Chinese folklore. On their quest to return Gizmo to his family and uncover a legendary treasure, they are pursued by a power-hungry industrialist and his growing army of evil Gremlins.

Voice cast 
 Izaac Wang as Sam Wing
 Ming-Na Wen as Fong Wing
 B. D. Wong as Hon Wing
 James Hong as Grandpa Wing
 Matthew Rhys as Riley Greene
 A. J. Locascio as Gizmo
 Gabrielle Green as Elle
 Zach Galligan as Billy Peltzer

Guest Stars 
 Sandra Oh
 Randall Park
 George Takei
 Bowen Yang

Development 
On February 25, 2019, WarnerMedia greenlighted an animated series based on Gremlins, for its streaming service HBO Max. Tze Chun was confirmed to write the series and serve as an executive producer with Darryl Frank, Justin Falvey, Sam Register, and Brendan Hay. On July 1, 2019, the series, now titled Gremlins: Secrets of the Mogwai, was given a series order of 10 episodes.

In February 2020, Joe Dante, director of the original two films, revealed that he was acting as a consultant for the series. In July of that same year, it was revealed that Howie Mandel will not reprise his role as Gizmo for the series. On February 17, 2021, ahead of the series premiere, HBO Max renewed the series for a second season at the TCA virtual Press Tour.

In February 2021, the voice cast of Izaac Wang, Ming-Na Wen, B. D. Wong, James Hong, Matthew Rhys, and Gabrielle Green was announced, with A. J. Locascio voicing Gizmo. In December 2021, the first clip was shown in a HBO Max trailer for 2022 releases. In July 2022, Zach Galligan, Sandra Oh, Randall Park, George Takei, and Bowen Yang were revealed to have reoccurring roles in the series.

Release
In March 2022, it was announced the series would premiere its first episode at the Annecy International Animation Film Festival on June 13, 2022. In September 2021, it was announced the series would air on Cartoon Network as part of their ACME Night block. On May 16, 2022, Warner Bros. Animation revealed a first look of the main characters for the series. The series is set to debut on HBO Max in 2023, consisting of 10 episodes.

References

External links 
 

2020s American animated television series

American children's animated comedy television series
American children's animated fantasy television series
American computer-animated television series
American prequel television series
Animated television shows based on films
English-language television shows
Gremlins (franchise)
HBO Max original programming
Television series by Amblin Entertainment
Television series by Warner Bros. Animation
Television series set in the 1920s
Television shows set in Shanghai
Upcoming animated television series